The Central Forensic Science Laboratory (CFSL) is a wing of the Indian Ministry of Home Affairs, which fulfills the forensic requirements in the country.

The locations
There are seven central forensic laboratories in India, at Hyderabad, Kolkata, Chandigarh, New Delhi, Guwahati, Bhopal and Pune.

CFSL Hyderabad is a centre of excellence in chemical sciences, CFSL Kolkata (the oldest laboratory in India) in biological sciences and CFSL Chandigarh in physical sciences.  The CFSL New Delhi comes under the Central Bureau of Investigation, Delhi, whereas the other laboratories are under the control of the Directorate of Forensic Science Services (DFSS) of the Ministry of Home Affairs. The laboratory in New Delhi is under the control of the Central Bureau of Investigation (CBI) and investigates cases on its behalf. Dr. Asha Srivastava is currently Director of CFSL (CBI) New Delhi.  Mr. Brijendra Badonia is the Director of CFSL Kolkata, Sh Mahesh Chandra Joshi is Director of CFSL Hyderabad and Dr. S.K. Jain is in charge of CFSL Chandigarh.

See also
National Forensic Sciences University
Lok Nayak Jayaprakash Narayan National Institute of Criminology & Forensic Science

References

External links
 Directorate Of Forensic Science (DFS), Official website
CFSL, Delhi at CBI website
 CFSL, Kolkata, website

Forensics organizations
Research institutes in Kolkata
Medical and health government agencies of India
Research institutes in West Bengal
Organizations with year of establishment missing